Long Branch is a  long 1st order tributary to Clarks Creek in Patrick County, Virginia.

Course 
Long Branch rises about 1.5 miles south of The Hollow in Patrick County, Virginia and then flows generally east to join Clarks Creek about 3 miles southeast of Ararat.

Watershed 
Long Branch drains  of area, receives about49.5 in/year of precipitation, has a wetness index of 280.40, and is about 72% forested.

See also 
 List of Virginia Rivers

References 

Rivers of Patrick County, Virginia
Rivers of Virginia